Warren Smith (born 29 December 1941) is an Australian cricketer. He played nine first-class matches for Western Australia between 1961/62 and 1962/63.

See also
 List of Western Australia first-class cricketers

References

External links
 

1941 births
Living people
Australian cricketers
Western Australia cricketers